The MTV Video Music Award for Ringtone of the Year was only given out in 2006.  The award was fully fan-voted, just like the other categories at the 2006 VMAs (except for technical categories).

MTV Video Music Awards
Awards established in 2006
Awards disestablished in 2006